Feltzen South is a small village in Nova Scotia, Canada and features The Ovens Natural Park. The community is located in the Lunenburg Municipal District in Lunenburg County.

Gallery

References
Municipality of the District of Lunenburg

Communities in Lunenburg County, Nova Scotia
General Service Areas in Nova Scotia